Barbara Wood (born January 30, 1947, in Warrington (Lancashire, England) is an American writer of historical romance novels.  Her family moved to California, where she grew up. In 2002, she received the Corine Literature Prize.

Bibliography

As Barbara Wood
Hounds and Jackals,	1978
The Magdalene Scrolls,	1978
Curse this House,	1978
Yesterday's Child,	1979
Night Trains,	1979
Childsong,	1981
The Watch Gods,	1981
Domina,	1983
Vital Signs,	1985
Soul Flame,	1987
Green City in the Sun, 	1988
The Gifts of Peace,	1990
The Dreaming,	1991
Virgins of Paradise,	1993
The Prophetess,	1996
Perfect Harmony,	1998
Sacred Ground,	2001
The Blessing Stone,	2003
Star of Babylon,	2005
Woman of a Thousand Secrets, 2008
This Golden Land, 2010
The Divining, 2012
The Serpent and the Staff, 2013
Rainbows on the Moon, 2016
Land of the Afternoon Sun, 2016

As Kathryn Harvey
Butterfly, 1989
Stars, 1993 ((2010)  )
Private Entrance, 2005

Filmography 
German TV films
Barbara Wood: Herzflimmern (1998, based on Vital Signs)
Barbara Wood: Traumzeit (2001, based on The Dreaming)
Barbara Wood: Spiel des Schicksals (2002, based on Hounds and Jackals)
Barbara Wood: Lockruf der Vergangenheit (2004, based on Curse this House)
Barbara Wood: Das Haus der Harmonie (2005, based on Perfect Harmony)
Barbara Wood: Sturmjahre (2007, based on Domina)
Barbara Wood: Karibisches Geheimnis (2009, based on Private Entrance)

References
Fantastic fiction (bibliography)

External links
Barbara Wood's personal site

1947 births
English emigrants to the United States
American romantic fiction writers
Living people
American women novelists
Women romantic fiction writers
Writers from Lancashire
Writers from California
20th-century American novelists
20th-century American women writers
21st-century American novelists
21st-century American women writers